Annie Cummings Greenaway was a Montserratian soprano soloist.

Early life and education 
Born in 1905, Greenaway's mother moved to Trinidad, and later to the United States, when she was three, leaving her under the guardianship of an aunt. Having joined her church's choir when she was 11, Greenaway would join her mother in New York City in 1923, where she would attend high school and later the New York College of Music, which she attended for three years. She married Joseph Greenaway in 1932.

Career 
In 1938, she became the lead singer of the Union Congregational Church choir. That same year, she presented her pupils in a recital which featured Daniel Galloway, Olive Arthur, and G. Francis, all of whom were described as "great artists" by The New York Age. On July 17, 1949, Greenaway performed in Montserrat, which drew a crowd of 600, including governor Earl Baldwin and commissioner Charlesworth Ross. She was also a philanthropist, benefiting Montserrat and other third world countries. George Irish, the composer of the national song of Monserrat, wrote a book, entitled Perspectives for Alliouagana : a tribute to Mme. Annie Cummings-Greenaway, Caribbean-American humanitarian and role model; it was published in 1990.

References

1905 births
Year of death missing
Montserratian women
American sopranos